Randolph Guggenheimer (July 20, 1846 – September 12, 1907) was a politician in New York City who served as the inaugural President of the Council of the City of Greater New York from 1898 through 1901. He was Jewish, and a philanthropist towards many Jewish causes. He died at his home in Elberon on September 12, 1907.

References

Jewish American people in New York (state) politics
New York City Council members
1846 births
1907 deaths
People from Lynchburg, Virginia
19th-century American politicians